Glover is a small community in Dickey County, North Dakota, United States, located north and west of Oakes at latitude 46.242 and longitude -98.139.

References

Unincorporated communities in Dickey County, North Dakota
Unincorporated communities in North Dakota